Erica Cho is a bi-coastal (Philadelphia and Los Angeles) visual artist, animator, and filmmaker. They are Assistant Professor of Narrative Media in the Department of Visual Arts at the University of California, San Diego, and were previously a visiting assistant professor at Swarthmore College in the Film and Media Studies department. Cho has acted as a film curator for the Los Angeles Asian Pacific Film Festival since 2011, and organized and founded the first Tri-Co Film Festival in 2012. They have received the Creative Capital Moving Image Award, among other awards.

Cho's work often explores various intersections between LGBTQ and Asian-American themes as described in their 2011 interview with the website Asian Gay and Proud:

Education
Cho received a BFA in art from Pennsylvania State University, where they received University Honors, and also received an MFA in Studio Art with an emphasis in experimental film and animation from UC Irvine.

Selected works
Community Speculators – Queers, Aliens, Time, Space, Love, Labor, and Value, Armory Center for the Arts, May 2013	
New Stories from the Edge of Asia: This/That, San Jose Museum of Art, February 2013
Grow, Morono Kiang Gallery, June 2010
You Gave Me Brave, S1F Gallery, October 2009
20 Years Ago Today, Japanese American National Museum, October 2008
Still Present Pasts: Korean Americans and the Forgotten War, LA Artcore Union Center for the Arts, February 2007

References

American women artists
American women film directors
American animated film directors
American women animators
Animators from California
Animators from Pennsylvania
Artists from Los Angeles
Artists from Philadelphia
American filmmakers
American LGBT artists
American LGBT people of Asian descent
American artists of Asian descent
University of California, Irvine alumni
Pennsylvania State University alumni